The 1974 Brisbane Rugby League season was the 66th season of the Brisbane Rugby League premiership. Eight teams from across Brisbane competed for the premiership, which culminated in Fortitude Valley defeating Past Brothers 9–2 in the grand final.

Ladder

Finals

References

1974 in rugby league
1974 in Australian rugby league
Rugby league in Brisbane